Three ships of the British Royal Navy have been named HMS Cutlass after the weapon:

 HMS Cutlass (G74), a  laid down in 1945 but cancelled before completion.
 , a  launched in 1968 and disposed of in 1982.
  is the first of the new Gibraltar fast patrol boats.

Royal Navy ship names